The Popular University of Chontalpa (in Spanish: Universidad Popular de la Chontalpa), popularly known as UPCh, is a public, coeducational university located in the city of Cárdenas, Tabasco, Mexico. It was founded on August 24, 1995, by the municipal government of the city of Cárdenas, thus becoming the first municipal university of the country. On November 17, 1998, the university becomes registered as a national institution of higher level education.

External links
Official Website Popular University of the Chontalpa

Universities and colleges in Tabasco
Educational institutions established in 1995
1995 establishments in Mexico